Palme is a surname. Notable people with the surname include:

Franc Palme (1914–1946), Yugoslavian Olympic alpine skier
Gabriele Palme (born 1964), German handball player
Henry Palmé (1907–1987), Swedish marathon runner
Joakim Palme (born 1958), Swedish political scientist, son of Olof and Lisbet Palme
Lisbet Palme (1931–2018), international chairwoman for UNICEF, wife of Olof Palme
Mårten Palme (born 1961), Swedish economist, son of Olof and Lisbet Palme
Olof Palme (1927–1986), the assassinated former Prime Minister of Sweden
Rajani Palme Dutt (1896–1974), British politician
Rudolf Palme (1910–2005), Austrian chess player
Sieur de la Palme, Newfoundland governor
Ulf Palme (1920–1993), Swedish actor